Montie FM is a private FM radio station broadcasting from Accra, Ghana. In August 2016, Montie Fm was involved in a criminal contempt suit with the Supreme Court of Ghana.

Ownership
It is owned by Network Broadcasting Company Limited although its operating frequency of 101.1 was set up by Harry Zakour of Zeze Media as a propaganda tool for the National Democratic Congress political party. Its board of directors are Ato Ahwoi (brother of Kwesi Ahwoi), Edward Addo, Kwasi Kyei Darwkah, and Kwesi Bram Addo.

References

Radio stations in Ghana